Paul Peter Murphy, Baron Murphy of Torfaen,  (born 25 November 1948) is a British Labour Party politician who was the Member of Parliament (MP) for Torfaen from 1987 to 2015, and served in the Cabinet from 1999 to 2005 and again from 2008 to 2009 in the roles of Northern Irish and Welsh Secretary.  He was nominated for a life peerage in the 2015 Dissolution Honours.

Background
Paul Peter Murphy was born to Ronald and Marjorie (née Gough) Murphy. He has a younger brother, Neil. Murphy's father, Ronald, was a miner of Irish descent. The family was devoutly Catholic. His mother, Marjorie (née Gough), was English, and her family were businesspeople.

Paul Murphy attended St Francis Roman Catholic School, Abersychan and West Monmouth School, Pontypool. He later attended Oriel College, Oxford to study history. He was a management trainee with the CWS, before becoming a lecturer in Government and History at Ebbw Vale College of Further Education, now part of Coleg Gwent. He has never married. Murphy once said in an interview "I have so many books, there's only enough room for me".

Early political career
Murphy joined the Labour Party at age 15, and is a member of the Transport and General Workers Union. He was Secretary of the Pontypool/Torfaen Constituency Labour Party from 1971 to 1987. He was a member of Torfaen Council from 1973 to 1987 and was chair of its finance committee from 1976 to 1986. He contested Wells Constituency in Somerset in the 1979 General Election.

Senior Cabinet posts
He was MP for Torfaen, Wales from the 1987 election. In opposition he served as a foreign affairs spokesperson and then in defence as navy spokesperson.

Following the 1997 election Murphy was appointed to the position of Minister of State for Northern Ireland.

He joined the cabinet in July 1999 following his appointment as Secretary of State for Wales on 28 July 1999. In 2002 he moved departments and became Secretary of State for Northern Ireland a role in which he served until his dismissal in the reshuffle that followed the 2005 general election when he became chairman of the Intelligence and Security Committee. He also served as the British chair of the British-Irish Inter-Parliamentary Body and an executive committee member of the British-American Parliamentary Group.

Following the resignation of Peter Hain from the cabinet on 24 January 2008, he was again appointed Secretary of State for Wales he was also given the job of chairing a new Cabinet Committee on the sensitive issue of IT and information security, in the wake of a rash of scandals surrounding the loss of personal data by Government agencies. In April 2008 he was appointed as the Government's Minister for Digital Inclusion. Prior to joining the Cabinet he was Minister of State for political development in the Northern Ireland Office from 1997 to 1999 – acting as Mo Mowlam's deputy – and was largely responsible for negotiating the so-called strand two ('North-South' or 'Island of Ireland') arrangements agreed in the Good Friday Agreement.

He left the cabinet in 2009 when he was replaced as Welsh Secretary by Peter Hain following Hain's clearance following an investigation into election donations.

In 2013, Murphy wrote a report on the lack of success of applicants to Oxbridge universities from Welsh state schools. The report suggested the creation of the Seren Network, a set of regional hubs to link schools to top universities.

Voting record
In 1979 Murphy was a fierce opponent of devolution. Murphy recently said "I have been trying to work out whether or not I am a devo-sceptic and I have come to the conclusion that I am not. In 1978, I was a devo-opponent, and in 1997 I voted for devolution. My constituents agreed with me in 1978, but they did not agree with me in 1997, because they voted against a Welsh Assembly on both occasions. However, I would rather describe myself as a devo-realist, in the sense that what is here is here. I am not all that keen on a coalition in Cardiff, but we are where we are, and we have to work in the current political climate for the benefit of the people whom we represent, whether we are members of parliament, Assembly Members or members of local authorities".

In a free parliamentary vote on 20 May 2008, Murphy voted for cutting the upper limit for abortions from 24 to 12 weeks, along with two other Catholic cabinet ministers Ruth Kelly and Des Browne. In 2013, he became one of the few Labour MPs to vote against the bill that legalised same-sex marriage in England and Wales, which was eventually passed with cross-party support.

Parliamentary expenses
Murphy was subject to criticism over his expenses claims, revealed by the Daily Telegraph during the United Kingdom parliamentary expenses scandal. Most notable of these was his £3,419.25 claim to have a new boiler installed in his Westminster house, stating that the previous one was a hazard as "The hot water was far too hot".

Other claims submitted by Paul Murphy relate to purchases of a toilet roll holder, new carpeting and a television, as well as mortgage payments and stamp duty. Murphy was ordered to repay some of the money improperly "claimed back" in the amount of £2,237.72 in cleaning costs, mortgage payments and a wardrobe that exceeded the guideline price.

Personal life
Murphy was created a life peer taking the title Baron Murphy of Torfaen, of Abersychan in the County of Gwent on 20 October 2015.

He is a member of the Oxford and Cambridge Club.

References

External links

|-

|-

|-

|-

|-

1948 births
Living people
People from Pontypool
Alumni of Oriel College, Oxford
British Secretaries of State
Fellows of Oriel College, Oxford
Knights of St. Gregory the Great
Labour Party (UK) life peers
Life peers created by Elizabeth II
Welsh Labour Party MPs
People educated at West Monmouth School
Members of the Privy Council of the United Kingdom
Secretaries of State for Northern Ireland
Secretaries of State for Wales
Transport and General Workers' Union-sponsored MPs
UK MPs 1987–1992
UK MPs 1992–1997
UK MPs 1997–2001
UK MPs 2001–2005
UK MPs 2005–2010
UK MPs 2010–2015
Welsh people of Irish descent
20th-century Roman Catholics
Welsh Roman Catholics
British Roman Catholics
21st-century Roman Catholics